The buildings in the Johnson Space Center house facilities of the National Aeronautics and Space Administration's human spaceflight activities. The center consists of a complex of 100 buildings constructed on  located in southeast Houston, Texas.

A typical building at Johnson Space Center is numbered and not named. A partial listing of building numbers and what is contained in them follows:

See also

Mission Control Center
Neutral Buoyancy Laboratory
Ellington Field

Notes

Buildings of the United States government in Texas
Buildings
Buildings and structures in Houston
Tourist attractions in Houston
Space technology research institutes
Economy of Houston
Buildings in the Johnson Space Center
Lists of buildings and structures in Texas